The Seine Meets Paris is a 1957 French short documentary film directed by Joris Ivens from a screenplay by Jacques Prévert. Told from the perspective of a boat trip through the city, it features scenes of daily life along the river. The film won the short film Palme d'Or at the 1958 Cannes Film Festival.

External links

Cannes festival entry
Institut Francais entry (French)

1957 documentary films
1957 films
Black-and-white documentary films
Documentary films about Paris
Films directed by Joris Ivens
1950s French-language films
French short documentary films
1950s short documentary films
1957 short films
1950s French films